The Monastery of Panayia Yiatrissa is an Orthodox Christian monastery located in the southern Peloponnese of Greece.  The monastery was erected on the site of the ruins of an ancient temple of Athena.  The conversion of the temple from pagan to Christian took place possibly as early as 382 AD.

The site grew to include many structures spread over a wide area, but sometime later it was largely if not wholly abandoned. Tradition holds that it was reestablished as a Christian monastery in 1683 and that numerous miraculous healings have occurred there.

Over the ages, the condition of the monastery has ebbed and flowed with the tide of wars, occupations, famines, and faltering or flourishing economies. Today, the monastery complex includes a moderately sized, ornately decorated, Byzantine-style church, and a second small but quaint chapel. Residential quarters for overnight visitors surround the interior courtyard.  Outside, the monastery rewards visitors with scenic 360 degree vistas, made accessible by an impressive rampart that encircles the complex and enables visitors to easily walk the site perimeter.

Dedicated to “Our Lady of Healing,” the monastery is primarily used to celebrate the Nativity of Mary, the feast day commemorating the birth of the Virgin Mary, which occurs annually on September 8.  Greek churches dedicated to the Virgin Mary are usually called Panagia.

On the feast day, hundreds or thousands of worshippers converge on the monastery from all directions, individually or in large groups, arriving by foot, bicycle, car, bus, or other means. The monastery has sleeping and eating quarters for several dozen overnight visitors, but the remainder either camp outside or find other accommodations.

The monastery was declared a holy shrine in 1972, and since 1977 it has been staffed full-time by clergy in residence.  The monastery maintains a minimal staff of one or two residents.  Despite this, it is open most days and accepts visitors and tourists, welcoming even those arriving primarily for the magnificent views of the mountains, valleys, and seas below. Liturgies are held regularly, and special services and visits can be arranged on short-notice by contacting the monastery.

Name 

The Greek word Panayia (Παναγία) or Panagia literally means “All Holy;” however, it is used in the Eastern Orthodox Church as a title for the Virgin Mary, the mother of Jesus Christ.  In English, and in western Christian traditions like the Roman Catholic Church, the analogous title is “Our Lady.”

The word Yiatrissa (Γιάτρισσα) comes from the Greek for “Doctor” or more generally, “Healer.”

Thus, a literal translation of Panayia Yiatrissa yields “All Holy Healer,” but a more commonly understood English translation is “Our Lady of Healing,” which provides a more clear reference to the Virgin Mary.

The name Panayia Yiatrissa is pronounced: pah-nah-YEE-ah yee-AH-tree-sah  (/pɑːnɑː'jiːɑː jiː’ɑːtriːsɑː/)

Locale 

Panayia Yiatrissa is located on the Taygetos mountain range where it juts into the Mediterranean Sea and forms the southernmost peninsula of mainland Greece, also known as the Mani Peninsula, ending at Cape Matapan (more commonly called Cape Tenaro).  The monastery is near the Vasiliki Forest of Taygetos, 5 km from Kastania. It sits on a saddle ridge straddling the eastern and western slopes of Taygetos, with the Laconian Gulf visible to the east and the Messinian Gulf visible to the west.  This location is one of few natural crossing points between the two slopes of the peninsula. Administratively, Panayia Yiatrissa belongs to the two history-rich prefectures, Laconia and Messinia.

Panayia Yiatrissa also lies on Europe’s E4 long distance hiking path, as it traverses south from Sparta, crosses Taygetos, and descends to the sea at Gythio.

The Taygetos peninsula has been inhabited since Neolithic times and its archeological sites record several millennia of human history.  The region was densely populated at times, sought after by numerous empires, and served as a crossroads for invaders, marauders and pirates.  The population remained relatively high well into the 20th century; however, modern demographic trends and recent economic troubles have severely reduced the population.  Yet, during summer months the nearby beaches on both Laconian and Messinian shores attract millions of visitors, breathing a tenuous vitality into the area.  In addition to the beaches, visitors are attracted to the many historic sites and the natural beauty of the region.

Nearby Alepotrypa Cave houses one of the earliest Neolithic burial sites in Europe.

Mycenean beehive tombs have been discovered adjacent to the nearby village of Arna, approximately 2.5 air-miles away (4 km).

Roman era artifacts and burial sites (early centuries AD) are well known in/around the immediately adjacent villages of the Sminos municipality, the closest being at Kastania.

In the 1200s, Frankish crusaders subdued the region and established a major fortification at nearby Mystras.  After the fall of Constantinople in 1453, and the collapse of the Byzantine empire, the last Byzantine emperor made Mystras his stronghold, holding out for seven years until the city finally fell to the Ottoman Empire in 1460.

During the medieval era the Taygetos peninsula became known as the Mani Peninsula, and the local population became known as Μανιάτες (Maniotes), who claim to be descendants of the ancient Spartans.

During the Ottoman period, the Mani Peninsula became a hotbed of rebellious activity leading up to the Greek Revolution of 1821.  In an attempt to control the area, the Ottomans established new towns and posted a heavy garrison in/around the Castle of Bardounia, just below Panayia Yiatrissa.  Many battles were fought within earshot of the monastery, particularly the 1770 Battle of Kastania at the Venetzanakis towers.

During World War II, the area around Panayia Yiatrissa was home to many resistance fighters; and then again home to partisans during the Greek Civil war.

Birth of Panayia Yiatrissa 

The detailed history of Panayia Yiatrissa was described (as follows) in 1902 by the monastery’s Abbot Sofroniou Sarantopoulou, based on “factual information from multiple sources and consideration of oral tradition.” He found that a religious site had existed in different forms dating back centuries to times when Greeks believed in the twelve gods of Olympus, and that the monastery of today is located where a Temple of Athena once stood.  The temple had multiple priests who maintained the sanctuary and an altar for performance of rituals.  In the year 382 AD, a priest of the temple to Athena, a man named Vrasithas (Βρασίδας), traveled to the Peloponnesian city of Patras and was introduced to a new monotheistic religion, Christianity, that was burgeoning at the time.

(Modern scholars would probably note that the “Edict of Thessalonica” was issued in 380 AD, making Christianity the Roman Empire’s state religion.)

In Patras, Vrasithas was converted, baptized, and given the Christian name Vitalios (Βιτάλιος).  Upon his return to the Temple of Athena, he convincingly preached to the other priests, who also converted to Christianity.  Tradition states that these men then spread Christianity throughout the region of Laconia.

The Temple of Athena was transformed into a church dedicated to “γεννέσιον της Θεοτόκου και αειπάρθενου Μαρίας,” literally “the birth of the Mother of God, the ever-virgin Mary.”  Afterwards, the priests constructed a complex consisting of various buildings, eventually creating a small town spanning approximately 200,000 sq meters, the span being attested to by remnants of ancient structures that he states have been found.

He notes, however, that the tyranny of time and devastating wars have left little but the coarsest materials from this period.  Nonetheless, to this day, the area remains known as “καλογερικό,” meaning “a place of monks.”

From this era of Christianization, circa 400 AD, to the late 1600s, a large gap appears in Sarantopoulou’s history.  In fact, it is well known that this region of Laconia, the Mani peninsula in particular, resisted large-scale conversion for many centuries.

Another version of the history is more consistent with this fact.  According to regional lore, a well-known saint named Νίκων ο μετανοείτε, “Nikon the Repentist,” passed through the monastic complex and gained inspiration there (circa 980 AD).  He then went on to traverse the remote and rugged region of Mani, where the “fiery apostle of the new religion” is credited with building many churches in the recalcitrant Mani region below Taygetos.

The two versions are not entirely contradictory and perhaps both contain elements of truth.  In any event, it seems clear that after some additional centuries, the monastic complex fell into disuse and perhaps complete abandonment.

Sarantopoulou’s story picks up again, in 1632 AD, where he describes the legend of a local lord from the wealthy Iliofenti family of Kastania (“Chestnut town,” then known as Kastanitsa, or little Kastania), a village just below today’s Panayia Yiatrissa:

"Kyriakoulis Iliafentis with his wife Maria, both being 56 years of age and having no children, were distraught and ashamed by their childlessness” (it being a social stigma), “decided to separate themselves from the community of Kastania and to live in isolation.  With this in mind, they built a church on the old temple site using boulders that remained.  They also built a large bridge” (in the valley below) “to the town of Arna, and donated all their properties, to this purpose, and planned to build housing for monks to live on the monastery site.  Unexpectedly, however, the barren wife Maria gave birth to a son the year after they built the church; and she gave birth to a second son another year later.  From them are descendant many of the families…” (that are well known in Kastania, broader Laconia, and even distant regions, including) “…a branch of the Stefanopouli family that migrated to the Mediterranean island of Corsica, from which came Napoleon the Great."

Sarantopoulou’s account continues on to describe a variety of other miraculous events that have occurred in relation to Panayia Yiatrissa, many related to healings.  However, while it is clear that the name “Panayia” (Παναγία) may date back as far as the original temple’s conversion to Christianity (be it 382 or 980 AD), it is not clear when or why the name “Yiatrissa” (Γιάτρισσα) was first used.  There is a distinct possibility that the name was associated with the original Temple of Athena, as Athena is occasionally associated with the medical arts (yiatriki, ιατρική) as well as chastity and virginity (parthenos, παρθένος), making the combination of names “Panayia Yiatrissa” a natural transition for reference to the “Virgin Mary, Healer” (alternately “Our Lady the Healer”).

Gallery

References 

 Some of the information in this article was translated from :el:Παναγία η Γιάτρισσα

Further reading
 Palamas, Kostis, Everything, 16th volume, "The Doctor," [Yiatrissa] (in Greek), pp. 227–229, Biris Publications, Athens 1972. 

Greek Orthodox monasteries in Greece
Buildings and structures in the South Aegean
Byzantine architecture in Greece
Christian monasteries established in the 15th century
Christian monasteries in Greece